Anton Jože Gale (26 March 1944 — 25 March 2018) was a Slovenian ice hockey player. He competed in the men's tournaments at the 1964 Winter Olympics, the 1968 Winter Olympics and the 1972 Winter Olympics.

References

1944 births
2018 deaths
Slovenian ice hockey goaltenders
Olympic ice hockey players of Yugoslavia
Ice hockey players at the 1964 Winter Olympics
Ice hockey players at the 1968 Winter Olympics
Ice hockey players at the 1972 Winter Olympics
Sportspeople from Jesenice, Jesenice
Yugoslav ice hockey goaltenders
HDD Olimpija Ljubljana players
Slovenian ice hockey coaches
Yugoslav expatriate ice hockey people
Clinton Comets players
Syracuse Blazers players
Yugoslav expatriate sportspeople in the United States
Expatriate ice hockey players in the United States